Jewish Maternity Hospital was an obstetrics hospital located at 270-272 East Broadway, on the Lower East Side of Manhattan, New York City.

History
Jewish Maternity Hospital was chartered in 1906 and opened on February 15, 1909. It catered to the Jewish residents of the Lower East Side, who were the overwhelmingly predominant local population at the time, although expectant mothers of any religion were accepted.

In its first 20 years of operation, 31,295 babies were born at Jewish Maternity Hospital.

The hospital merged administratively with Beth Israel Hospital on December 19, 1929. Beth Israel was in financial straits because of cost overruns on a new building under construction at Stuyvesant Square, and Jewish Maternity Hospital had money available for their own construction plans. When Beth Israel finished their construction in 1931, Jewish Maternity Hospital also moved to the site. Both institutions’ names were kept for some time after the merger, but the Jewish Maternity Hospital name was eventually replaced by the Beth Israel name for all obstetrical services.

Births of people who became notable
 Jerome Robbins (1918–1998) – choreographer, director, dancer, and theater producer

Legacy
The building on the Lower East Side continued to be used for outpatient services, and was sold in 1943 to the Home of the Sages of Israel, a retirement home for rabbis located next door to the former hospital building. The structures were then combined and remodeled into an expanded retirement home.

The successor maternity services at Beth Israel Hospital continued to operate for several decades, but were closed on June 11, 2017, as part of that hospital's downsizing.

References

Hospitals established in 1906
Hospital buildings completed in 1909
Defunct hospitals in Manhattan
1906 establishments in New York City
Maternity hospitals in the United States
History of women in New York City